Robert Calderwood (born c. 1860) was a Scottish footballer, who played for Cartvale, Cowlairs, Bootle and Scotland. Calderwood scored three goals for Scotland in the 1884–85 British Home Championship, but was then suspended by the Scottish Football Association for becoming a professional player by signing for English club Bootle, after which he appeared for Cowlairs in the (amateur-only) 1887–88 Scottish Cup.

References

Sources

External links

London Hearts profile

Year of birth uncertain
Year of death missing
Scottish footballers
Scotland international footballers
Cowlairs F.C. players
Bootle F.C. (1879) players
Association football forwards